The Rural Municipality of Ochre River is a former rural municipality (RM) in the Canadian province of Manitoba. It was originally incorporated as a rural municipality on November 18, 1901. It ceased on January 1, 2015 as a result of its provincially mandated amalgamation with the RM of Lawrence to form the Rural Municipality of Lakeshore.

The former RM as located south of Dauphin Lake and took its name from the river and the community of Ochre River.

Communities 
 Makinak
 Ochre River

References 

 Geographic Names of Manitoba (pgs. 197-198) - the Millennium Bureau of Canada

External links 
 
 Map of Ochre River R.M. at Statcan

Ochre River
Populated places disestablished in 2015
2015 disestablishments in Manitoba